SEN Track is an Australian radio network operated by Sports Entertainment Network, a division of Pacific Star Network. The network launched on 28 March 2020 and broadcasts live coverage of horse, thoroughbred and greyhound racing to nine cities and towns in New South Wales, Queensland, Victoria and Western Australia. It is a sister network to the Melbourne-based 1116 SEN.

History

SEN Track was born out of SEN+, which commenced broadcasting in Melbourne on 13 August 2018. The station was a simulcast of the 1116 SEN service, opting out for coverage of sports including the NFL, VFL, NBL and Super Rugby. The station also broadcast coverage of the 2019 Spring Racing Carnival.

On 27 March 2020, Crocmedia announced it would launch SEN Track, a radio station covering horse, thoroughbred and greyhound racing. At the time, racing codes were the only Australian sports operating during the COVID-19 pandemic. SEN Track launched the following day in Melbourne, replacing SEN+, and on the former Rete Italia frequencies in Perth and Wollongong. In April, the network expanded to Gosford, Ingham and Atherton, with Crocmedia announcing it would replace Vision Christian Radio in Brisbane and Rete Italia on the Gold Coast from September.

In June 2020, Crocmedia announced it would sell the licence of its Melbourne station to ACE Radio, and seek to acquire a further three narrowcast licences from Gumnut Nominees, covering Melbourne, Sydney and Darwin.

Programming
Networked programming is produced mostly from Crocmedia's studios in South Melbourne. In Melbourne and Perth, the station simulcasts the final hour of Garry & Tim and the first two hours of Whateley from 1116 SEN.

In New South Wales and Queensland, two local programs — Breakfast with Joel and Jimmy and Sportsday Central — are produced from studios in North Sydney. Play-by-play coverage of Friday night National Rugby League matches also air in these markets under the NRL Nation brand, while coverage of Central Coast Mariners A-League matches are broadcast in Gosford.

Notable presenters

 Gary Belcher (Sportsday Central)
 Joel Caine (Breakfast in New South Wales)
 Garry Lyon (Garry & Tim)
 Scott Sattler (Sportsday Central)

 Jimmy Smith (Breakfast in New South Wales)
 Tim Watson (Garry & Tim)
 Gerard Whateley (Whateley)

Transmitters

References

External links
 

Pacific Star Network
Australian radio networks
Radio stations in Melbourne
Radio stations in Victoria
Radio stations in Sydney
Radio stations in New South Wales
Radio stations in Brisbane
Radio stations on the Gold Coast, Queensland
Radio stations in Queensland
Radio stations in Perth, Western Australia
Sports radio stations in Australia
Radio stations established in 2020